"Little White Church" is a song co-written and recorded by American country music band Little Big Town, written by the band along with Wayne Kirkpatrick. It was released in March 2010 as the lead-off single from their album The Reason Why, released on August 24, 2010.

Content
"Little White Church" is an up-tempo country song, backed primarily by electric guitar, with a hand-clap during the pre-chorus. The song's female narrator confronts her love interest, telling him that he's not welcome anymore unless he "take[s her] down to the little white church" and marries her. Band member Karen Fairchild performs lead vocals for the song.

Critical reception
Juli Thanki of Engine 145 gave the song a thumbs up, describing it as something that stands out "when so many singles on the radio sound the same." She also noted that in a "time of year when an infectious, upbeat hit ushers in spring after a dreary winter," this song "fits the bill perfectly." Kevin John Coyne of Country Universe gave the song an A− rating, favoring the groups' harmonies and the instrumentation. He concluded that with "a few more records like Laura Bell Bundy’s and this one, and country radio just might get interesting again." Bobby Peacock of Roughstock spoke positively of the song, favoring "the song's energetic performance and uncluttered production," although he felt the song's lyrics were "a bit simplistic in parts." Slant Magazine included the song in its "Best of 2010: Singles" chart, ranking the song at number fourteen, calling it "distinctive and seductive; one of the few bright spots on country radio this year."

Music video
The music video, which was directed by Kristin Barlowe, premiered on CMT on June 1, 2010. The video begins with Karen Fairchild getting dressed up for her wedding before leaving her house and beginning to walk down a country road. She is soon joined by the rest of Little Big Town, and the group proceeds to the church. While she is on the way to the little white church, Fairchild's mother gags her fiance and ties him up. When the group arrives at the church, no one has seen her groom, and they exit the church. The group is then shown performing on stage with  vintage microphones at an outdoor festival, while Fairchild's mother lifts up the trunk of a car, revealing the groom tied up inside, before handing off the keys to the band and allowing them to drive away.

Chart performance
"Little White Church" debuted at number 48 on the U.S. Billboard Hot Country Songs chart for the week of March 20, 2010. It became the group's first Top 10 single since "Bring It On Home" in 2006, reaching a peak of number 6 for the week of October 9, 2010.

Year-end charts

Certifications

References

2010 singles
Little Big Town songs
Songs written by Karen Fairchild
Songs written by Kimberly Schlapman
Songs written by Phillip Sweet
Songs written by Jimi Westbrook
Songs written by Wayne Kirkpatrick
Capitol Records Nashville singles
2010 songs